A whisk is a kitchen utensil

Whisk may also refer to:

 Fly-whisk, used as a flyswatter or as regalia
 Whisk broom, a kind of broom, a cleaning instrument
 Whisk (ballroom dance), a ballroom dance step used in waltz

see also
 IBM/Apache's OpenWhisk